Tamás Kerékjártó (born 9 July 1979 in Miskolc) is a Hungarian swimmer. He represented his home country at the 1996, 2004 and 2008 Olympic Games.

References

1979 births
Living people
Hungarian male swimmers
Male medley swimmers
Sportspeople from Miskolc
Olympic swimmers of Hungary
Swimmers at the 1996 Summer Olympics
Swimmers at the 2004 Summer Olympics
Swimmers at the 2008 Summer Olympics
European Aquatics Championships medalists in swimming
20th-century Hungarian people
21st-century Hungarian people